Eqaluarssuit Fjord (Danish: Laksefjorden, Swedish: Laksefjorden (sv)) is a fjord of Greenland. It is located in the Upernavik Archipelago.

Fjords of the Upernavik Archipelago